George Peck may refer to:

George Peck, co-founder of Peck & Peck, a former New York-based retailer of private label women's wear prominent on Fifth Avenue
George Peck (artist) (born 1941), Hungarian visual artist
George Peck (clergyman) (1797–1876), clergyman, author, editor of the Methodist Episcopal Church
George Peck (Ontario politician) (1917–1993), Ontario provincial MPP
George Peck (theatre), principal founder of The Oxford School of Drama
George H. Peck (1856–1940), California real estate developer
George Washington Peck (1818–1905), U.S. Representative from Michigan.
George Wilbur Peck (1840–1916), author, mayor of Milwaukee, governor of Wisconsin

See also
G. W. Peck, mathematical group pseudonym sometimes identified with George Wilbur Peck
Peck (surname)